Russell Woodruffe (born 8 November 1985) is an Australian footballer who plays for Redlands United.

He has represented the Australian under 20 team and the under 23 side.

Playing career

Club
In May 2005, Woodruffe was signed by Central Coast Mariners for the inaugural A-League season.

In 2014, Woodruffe moved into a dual player-coach role with Redlands United.

References

1985 births
Living people
Soccer players from Brisbane
Australian soccer players
Australia youth international soccer players
Australia under-20 international soccer players
A-League Men players
Northern Spirit FC players
Brisbane Strikers FC players
Central Coast Mariners FC players
Parramatta FC players
National Premier Leagues players
Association football forwards